Acrocercops nolckeniella is a moth of the family Gracillariidae, known from Colombia and Guyana. It was described by P.C. Zeller in 1977. The hostplant for the species is an unidentified species of Brugmansia.

References

nolckeniella
Moths of South America
Moths described in 1877